Roccella Ionica (also known as Roccella Jonica or simply as Roccella is a town and comune  located on the Ionian Sea in Calabria, southern Italy.

Possibly built on the site of the ancient Greek settlement of Amphissa, Roccella is probably best known for hosting a major annual jazz festival. It is a town on the sea and has many tourists in summer for beach vacations.

Twin towns
 Arco

References

Sources
Elio Walter Barillaro, Roccella Jonica e Maria SS. Delle Grazie nel 450 Anniversario del Miracolo (1545-1995) (1995)

Cities and towns in Calabria
Vallata dello Stilaro